Ekow Benson (born April 23, 1989, in Akwatia) is a Ghanaian football player, he is currently attached to Asante Kotoko F.C.

Career 
Benson began his career for New Odona Schalke 04 and joined in 2004 to Fauzan FC. After two years for Fauzan,he joined in January 2006 to Tema Youth who has been a trial with Stade Rennais in 2007. He played two and a half year for Tema Youth and signed in August 2008 for Asante Kotoko.

Position 
He is usually fielded as right winger.

International career 
Benson made his debut for Ghana in a friendly against Brazil on March 27, 2008.

Personal life 
His half brother is John Mensah.

References

External links

1989 births
Living people
Association football wingers
Ghanaian footballers
Ghana international footballers
Tema Youth players